The Nigerian Chieftaincy is the chieftaincy system that is native to Nigeria. Consisting of everything from the country's monarchs to its titled family elders, the chieftaincy as a whole is one of the oldest continuously existing institutions in Nigeria and is legally recognized by its government.

History

  
Nigerian pre-colonial states tended to be organized as 
city-states. The empires that did exist, like the Kanem-Borno empire, the Oyo empire, the Benin empire and the Sokoto caliphate, were essentially coalitions of these individual city-states. Due to this, a great deal of local power was concentrated in the hands of rulers that remained almost permanently in their capitals. These rulers had sacred functions - a number of them were even considered to be sacred themselves - and therefore often lived in seclusion as a result. Their nobles, both hereditary and otherwise, typically also had functions that were tied to the religious traditions of the kingdoms that they served.

In the South, the nobles ruled the states on a day-to-day basis on behalf of their monarchs by way of a series of initiatory secret societies. These bodies combined the aforementioned priestly functions with judicial ones, and also traditionally provided advisers to the monarchs in question. Some of these societies, like Ogboni and Nze na Ozo, have survived to the present day as aristocratic social clubs within their respective tribes. Meanwhile, in the North, the emirates of the old caliphate were usually divided into districts, and these districts were in turn ruled by nobles known as Hakimi (pl. Hakimai) that were subject to the monarchs.

As a general rule titles did not always pass from father to son; many royal and noble families did however provide a number of titleholders over several generations. In the south, the titles held by nobles were often not the same ones as those that had been held by others in their lineages. Some chiefs had even been untitled slaves, and therefore had had no titled forebears prior to their eventual ascension to the ranks of the aristocracy.

Although dominated by the titled men mentioned above, several kingdoms also had parallel traditions of exclusively-female title societies that operated in partnership with their male counterparts. Others would reserve specially created titles, such as the Yoruba Iyalode, for their womenfolk.

During the early European forays into Africa, Nigerian chiefs - both monarchs and nobles - came to be divided into two opposing camps: the anti-European chiefs on the one end (who wanted nothing to do with the Europeans and wanted them to leave, by war if necessary) and the pro-European chiefs (who favoured maintaining friendly relations with the Europeans, even if it meant sacrificing certain amounts of political power). During the increase in British influence in Nigeria during the 19th century, the anti-European chiefs used a variety of tactics to work against foreign influence, utilizing both direct and indirect forms. The colonial government responded by favouring the pro-European chiefs and supporting more amenable claimants to the Nigerian titles in an attempt to frustrate the anti-European chiefs. Minor wars were fought with the anti-European chiefs, while pro-European chiefs prospered through trade with Britain and so were politically safe as a result. During the Scramble for Africa, anti-European chiefs were slowly replaced with pro-European ones, and Colonial Nigeria came to be governed by a system known as indirect rule, which involved native chiefs becoming part of the administrative structure to ease administrative costs. Through this method, the colonial government was able to avoid any rebellions against its authority.

Following Nigeria's independence in 1960, each federated unit of the country had a House of Chiefs, which was part of its lawmaking system. These houses have since been replaced by the largely ceremonial Councils of Traditional Rulers. In addition, many of the founding fathers and mothers of the First Republic -  including the leading troika of Dr. Nnamdi Azikiwe, Chief Obafemi Awolowo and Alhaji Sir Ahmadu Bello - were all royals or nobles in the Nigerian chieftaincy system. This has continued to operate since their time as a locally controlled honours system alongside its nationally controlled counterpart, which is itself within the gift of the Federal Government.

Today

Today, many prominent Nigerians aspire to the holding of a title. Both Chief Olusegun Obasanjo and Alhaji Umaru Musa Yar'Adua, one-time presidents of Nigeria, have belonged to the noble stratum of the Nigerian chieftaincy. Nigerian traditional rulers and their titled subordinates currently derive their powers from various Chiefs' Laws, which are official parts of the body of contemporary Nigerian laws. As a result, the highly ranked amongst them typically receive staffs of office - and by way of them official recognition - from the governors of the states of the Federation as the culminations of their coronation and investiture rites. Thus installed, they then have the power to install inferior chiefs themselves.

Chieftaincy titles are often of differing grades, and are usually ranked according to a variety of diverse factors. Whether or not they are recognized by the government, whether they are traditionally powerful or purely honorary, what the relative positions of the title societies that they belong to (if any) are in the royal orders of precedence, their relative antiquity, how expensive they are to acquire, whether or not they are hereditary, and a number of other such customary determinants are commonly used to ascribe hierarchical positions. A number of kingdoms also make use of colour-coded regalia to denote either allegiance to particular title societies or individual rank within them. Examples of this phenomenon include the Red-Capped Chiefs of Igboland and the White-Capped Chiefs of Lagos, each the highest ranked group of noble chiefs in its respective sub-system.

Nigerian titleholders

Monarchs

Pre-colonial
 Nigerian sovereigns
 Lamido
 Oba
 Eze

Colonial
 Native Authorities

Post-colonial
 Nigerian traditional rulers
 Lamido
 Sultan of Sokoto
 Emir of Kano
 Etsu Nupe
 Oba
 Ooni of Ife 
 Alaafin of Oyo
 Awujale of Ijebu
 Eze
 Eze Nri
 Obi of Onitsha
 Igwe of Nnewi

Other Chiefs
 Waziri
 Hakimi
 Eso Ikoyi
 Ogboni
 Nze na Ozo
 Ichie

See also
 Social class in Nigeria
 Nigerian heraldry
 Nigerian traditional rulers
 Nigerian traditional states

References and sources

Society of Nigeria
Tribal chiefs
African nobility
Upper class